Ihler is a surname. Notable people with the surname include:

Bjørn Ihler (born 1991), Norwegian peace activist and public speaker 
Frederik Ihler (born 2003), Danish footballer
George Ihler (born 1943), American football player and coach

See also
Ihle (surname)